Howling Commandos of S.H.I.E.L.D. is a comic book series published by Marvel Comics in 2015. The series was a spinoff of the 2014 series S.H.I.E.L.D. by Mark Waid. It lasted for 6 issues.

Publication history
The series was part of All-New All-Different Marvel. The team first appeared in issue six of S.H.I.E.L.D. and picked up after issue nine.

Plot
A new team of Howling Commandos under the command of the S.H.I.E.L.D. subsidiary S.T.A.K.E. led by the rebuilt LMD of Dum Dum Dugan and under the supervision of Warwolf. It consists of Jasper Sitwell's zombie form, Vampire by Night, Man-Thing, Manphibian, Orrgo, Teen Abomination, and Hit-Monkey.

The first mission involved the Earth Idol of Golthana that was being smuggled on the S.S. Chaney and mutated its crew into humanoid plantlike monsters. While the Howling Commandos are successful in defeating the mutated crew members, they merged into one giant plantlike monster. Man-Thing used his touch to burn the giant plantlike monster where its link to the Earth Idol of Golthana caused it to burn as well.

The next mission that S.T.A.K.E gives to the Howling Commandos involves them fighting Sphinx and Adversary which led to them getting Glyph on their team.

During the Avengers: Standoff! storyline, Paul Kraye caught Orrgo going through some S.T.A.K.E. files and informed Maria Hill enough for Orrgo to be sent to Pleasant Hill. The rest of the Howling Commandos rescued Orrgo and were teleported back to S.T.A.K.E. HQ by Kobik where they found that Paul Kraye had released every monstrous inmate there. This causes the Howling Commandos to spring into action.

Reception
The series holds an average rating of 5.6 by 17 professional critics on the review aggregation website Comic Book Roundup.

Doug Zawisza of CBR.com stated that the book is a fun introduction to a new concept, but wrestles a little bit to find its identity.

Prints

Issues

Collected editions

See also
 2015 in comics
 Nick Fury's Howling Commandos

References

External links
 Howling Commandos of S.H.I.E.L.D. at the Comic Book DB

Howling Commandos
S.H.I.E.L.D. titles